Fairfield Glade is a resort, retirement community and census-designated place (CDP) in Cumberland County, Tennessee, United States. The population was 9,152 at the 2020 census, up over 3,000 from the 2010 census.

Geography
Fairfield Glade is located in eastern Cumberland County at  (35.994355, -84.884986). It is situated on several ridges and valleys on the Cumberland Plateau and is bordered to the east by the valley of Daddys Creek, a tributary of the Obed River, and to the north by the state Catoosa Wildlife Management Area.

Demographics

2020 census

As of the 2020 United States census, there were 9,152 people, 4,574 households, and 3,426 families residing in the CDP.

2000 census
As of the census of 2000, there were 4,885 people, 2,513 households, and 2,017 families residing in the CDP. The population density was 224.2 people per square mile (86.6/km2). There were 3,118 housing units at an average density of 143.1/sq mi (55.2/km2). The racial makeup of the CDP was 98.57% White, 0.53% African American, 0.04% Native American, 0.18% Asian, 0.04% Pacific Islander, 0.25% from other races, and 0.39% from two or more races. Hispanic or Latino of any race were 0.43% of the population.

There were 2,513 households, out of which 4.5% had children under the age of 18 living with them, 76.8% were married couples living together, 2.9% had a female householder with no husband present, and 19.7% were non-families. 18.0% of all households were made up of individuals, and 12.6% had someone living alone who was 65 years of age or older. The average household size was 1.94 and the average family size was 2.15.

In the CDP, the population was spread out, with 4.4% under the age of 18, 1.5% from 18 to 24, 6.5% from 25 to 44, 33.1% from 45 to 64, and 54.5% who were 65 years of age or older. The median age was 66 years. For every 100 females, there were 91.9 males. For every 100 females age 18 and over, there were 90.5 males.

The median income for a household in the CDP was $42,800, and the median income for a family was $45,938. Males had a median income of $37,404 versus $22,500 for females. The per capita income for the CDP was $26,403. About 1.6% of families and 2.3% of the population were below the poverty line, including none of those under age 18 and 0.3% of those age 65 or over.

Recreation facilities
Recreation facilities at Fairfield Glade include five 18-hole golf courses, several tennis courts, and 11 fishing lakes, the two largest of which have marinas and swimming areas.

The New Fairfield Glade Community Center features an indoor pool, gymnasium, locker rooms, shower facilities, gameroom, arts & crafts center, concessions, meeting rooms, media rooms, and a banquet room.

Community management and governance
Fairfield Glade is not an incorporated municipality, but is managed by the Fairfield Glade Community Club, a homeowner's association. Association responsibilities include enforcement of architectural standards, maintenance and operation of the golf courses and other resort amenities, road maintenance, and operation of the community's sewage treatment plant.

Some residences in Fairfield Glade are in timeshare ownership and are occupied for short periods by visitors.

Fairfield Glade also has their own police department.

References

External links
Fairfield Homes

Census-designated places in Cumberland County, Tennessee
Census-designated places in Tennessee